This is a list of ball games and ball sports that include a ball as a key element in the activity, usually for scoring points.

Ball games

Ball sports fall within many sport categories, some sports within multiple categories, including:
Bat-and-ball games, such as cricket and baseball.
Invasion games, such as football and basketball.
Net and wall games, such as volleyball.
Racket sports, such as tennis, table tennis, squash and badminton.
Throwing sports, such as dodgeball and bocce.
Cue sports, such as pool and snooker.
Target sports, such as golf and bowling.
 Hand and ball-striking games, such as various handball codes, rebound handball, and four square.

Popular ball games
Games that are similar and have a common reference are grouped under the primary name such as bowling, football and hockey.

A - E 
 Angleball
 Apalachee ball game
 Crossminton
 Bandy
 Rink bandy
 Rinkball
 Baseball
Baseball5
 Basketball
 3x3 (basketball)
 Wheelchair basketball
 Basque pelota
 Frontenis
 Jai alai
 Xare
 Beach tennis
 Bossaball
 Boules
 Bocce
 Bocce volo
 Boccia
 Bolas criollas
 Bowls or "lawn bowls"
 Jeu provençal
 Pétanque
 Raffa (boules)
 Bowling
 Candlepin bowling
 Carpet bowls
 Duckpin bowling
 Five-pin bowling
 Nine-pin bowling
 Ten-pin bowling                                                                                                                                       
 Irish road bowling 
 Brännboll
 British baseball
 Broomball
 Canoe polo                                                                                                                                                        i
 Cestoball
 Codeball
 Cricket (see cricket ball)
 Backyard cricket
 Twenty20
 Kwik cricket
 Vigoro
 Croquet
 Roque
 Cue sports (also knowns as billiards)
 Carom billiards
 English billiards
 Pool (or pocket billiards)
 Snooker
 Cycle ball
 Dodgeball
 Downball

F - K
 Fistball
 Fives
Flag football
 Flickerball
 Football
Association football (soccer)
 Futsal
 Indoor soccer
 Beach soccer
 Australian rules football
 Calcio fiorentino
 English public school football games
 Gaelic football
 Gridiron football
 American football
 Canadian football
 Indoor football
 Arena football
 Football tennis
 International rules football
 Medieval football games
Rugby football
 Rugby league
 Rugby union
 Rugby sevens
 Beach rugby
 Underwater rugby
 Wheelchair rugby
Underwater football
Volata
 Footvolley
 Four square
 Goalball
 Golf
 Mini Golf
 Half-rubber
 Handball
 American handball
 Australian handball
 Beach handball
 Field handball
 Gaelic Handball
 Hooverball
 Hockey
 Bandy
 Rink bandy
 Rinkball
 Field hockey
 Indoor field hockey
 Floor hockey
 Floorball
 Roller hockey
 Roller hockey (quad)
 Street hockey
 Hurling
 Jai alai
 Jokgu
 Jorkyball
 Juggling
 Kickball
 Kick-to-kick (includes end-to-end footy)
 Kin-Ball
 Klootschieten
 Knuckleball
 Korfball

L - P
 Lacrosse
 Box Lacrosse
 Field lacrosse
 Intercrosse
 Lawn bowls
 Mesoamerican ballgame
 Netball
 Fast5
 Newcomb ball
 Padbol
 Paddle ball
 Paddle-ball
 Paddle tennis
 Padel
 Paintball
 Palin
 Pelota mixteca
 Pesäpallo
 Picigin
 Pickleball
 Polo
 Bicycle polo
 Canoe polo
 Elephant polo
 Horseball
 Polocrosse
 Segway polo
 Yak polo
 Push ball

Q - Z
 Quidditch
 Racquetball
 Ringball
 Rock-It-Ball
 Rounders
 Sepak takraw
 Shinty
 Sipa
 Skee ball
 Slamball
 Softball
 Squash
 Stickball
 Stickball (Native American)
 Streetball
 Table football (foosball)
 Table tennis (ping pong)
 TagPro (esports)
 Tchoukball
 Team handball
 Tee ball
 Tennis
 Tetherball
 Teqball
 Ulama
 Valencian pilota
 Escala i corda
 Galotxa
 Galotxetes
 Llargues
 Raspall
 Valencian fronto
 Underwater sports
 Volleyball
 Beach volleyball
 Sitting volleyball
 Snow volleyball
 Waboba
 Water basketball
 Water polo
 Welsh handball
 Wiffleball
 Wireball

 
Sport-related lists by sport